Reach is an American brand of oral hygiene products, including toothbrushes, dental floss and mouthwash. The brand originated from Reach toothbrushes developed by DuPont in 1976.

History

1970s 
1976 – DuPont enters toothbrush market after four years of research conducted by "bio-dental team" from Tufts University, headed by Percy H. Hill Jr., consultant to Applied Ergonomics company. Reach Toothbrush was the first ergonomically designed toothbrush, that proved significantly better in clinical trials and spawned a whole new field of "toothbrush design".

1976 article at Chicago Tribune highlights the following unique selling propositions of the new toothbrush: "an angled-shaped four-sided handle (for comfortable gripping) with an extended neck (that makes hard-to-reach areas more accessible), and a compact head topped with bilevel bristles".

DuPont started new toothbrush promotion in April 1976 first in Green Bay, Wisconsin, then moved to Chicago, with advertising in newspapers and on TV.

1977 – Johnson & Johnson acquires Reach brand from DuPont, outmaneuvering Procter & Gamble.

1978 – Johnson & Johnson introduced the brand nationally, backing the launch with "the first million-dollar ad campaign ever produced for a toothbrush".

1980s 
1982 – Reach introduces Reach Child Brush.

1983 – Reach toothbrush was featured in Tooth Protectors videogame for the Atari 2600 video game console along with Johnson & Johnson dental floss and Act mouthwash.

1985 – Reach toothbrush gained recognition from American Dental Association.

1986 – Mr. Reach character with the famous flip-top head, was born in Australia. Developed by animator Phil Meatchem this mascot found its way to many world markets, including Japan and the U.S.

1987 – Johnson & Johnson advertised Reach toothbrush with the marketing claim that it "cleans 51% better than the other leading brush. It's angled to reach even back teeth".

At the end of 80's Reach occupied 28% of the US market, successfully competing against market leader Oral-B (35% of the market). However, by 1991 its market share dropped to 20%.

1990s 
1993 – Reach introduced first ever child toothbrush named "Wondergrip", designed by "Smart Design" (NY) studio. Previously, all children’s toothbrushes were just scaled down adult brushes. To make this toothbrush "Smart Design" studied the brushing behavior of more than 100 kids, coming up with the shape that encourages proper brushing technique.

1996 – Reach introduced Reach Plaque Sweeper toothbrush and Reach Floss Gentle Gum Care. J&J doubled its advertising budgets vs. previous year to more than $20 million – in a move aimed to recover market share that declined to 15.5%.

2000s 
2001 – Reach partnered with Warner Bros. and created Harry Potter Toothbrush for the start of Harry Potter and the Philosopher's Stone movie.

2006 – Fuel Industries developed a globe-trotting animated advergame "Mr. Reach: In the Mouth of Mystery" for Johnson & Johnson Canada, featuring various Reach dental products and Mr. Reach character.

2008 – In August 2008 Reach introduced Reach UltraClean toothbrush and floss.

2009 – Johnson & Johnson directly attacked its main competitors stating that Reach UltraClean floss removes up to two times more plaque than Glide (Procter & Gamble) floss and that UltraClean Toothbrush removes more plaque and provides improved gum health versus the Colgate 360° toothbrush. Based on clinical trials the company also stated that Reach UltraClean Toothbrush removes up to 90% of plaque in places that are hard to reach.

2010s 
2010 – Total Care Floss Clean toothbrush designed by Fuseproject won IDEA 2010 award. Same year Reach introduced new line "Reach Total Care Plus Whitening" with toothbrush and floss, designed to whiten teeth. Also in 2010 Reach started "Reach by design" collaboration with interior designers Celerie Kemble and Tom Delavan as well as celebrity fashion stylist Brad Goreski.

2011 – Reach Total Care Plus Whitening advertising came under criticism from the National Advertising Division, that suggested J&J to change claims "Ordinary toothbrushes clean teeth. Reach whitens them" and "At the core of this revolutionary toothbrush Reach has engineered a unique row of bristles infused with calcium carbonate microwhitening technology. That means each time you brush, you're whitening teeth and removing stains". As an outcome NAD determined that J&J could support the claim that "[o]rdinary toothbrushes clean teeth. Reach whitens them", but suggested to modify other claims to ensure that consumers are aware that stain removal is accomplished extrinsically, through the stain-removing abrasive action of the bristles, not intrinsically through bleaching. Also in 2011 Reach continued collaboration with design celebrities, inviting Flipping Out star Jeff Lewis and Shoshanna Gruss to join "Reach by Design" project.

2012 – In December 2012, Johnson & Johnson sold rights to market Reach toothbrushes in the United States, its territories, the Caribbean and Canada to Dr. Fresh LLC, a portfolio company of Moelis Capital Partners, for an undisclosed sum. The acquisition did not include Reach floss or other interdental products.

2014 – In April 2014 Dr. Fresh introduced "Complete Care Triple Angle" toothbrushes, presenting them on its website as "the most advanced Reach brushes ever made".

2015 – Dr. Fresh re-introduced Mr. Reach in its advertising for "Reach Complete Care 8-in-1 Rinse". At the same year Johnson & Johnson discontinued Reach brand name and rebranded Reach floss into Listerine floss, notifying consumers about this on official website in June 2015.

2016 - LG Household & Health Care announced on November 1, 2016 that it agreed to acquire the Asia Pacific business of Reach brand from Johnson & Johnson.

2017 - High Ridge Brands acquired Dr. Fresh LLC.

See also 

 Toothbrush

References

External links 
 Reach toothbrushes
 Reach dental floss (rebranded to Listerine Floss)
 

Dentifrices
Products introduced in 1976
American brands
Brands of toothpaste